A list of films produced in Russia in 2000 (see 2000 in film).

2000

See also
 2000 in Russia

External links
 Russian films of 2000 at the Internet Movie Database

2000
Russia
Films